Zbinden is a surname. Notable people with the surname include:

Carlos Zbinden (born 1976), Chilean hurdler
Fritz Zbinden (1922–1983), Swiss cyclist
Pascal Zbinden (born 1974), Swiss footballer

External links
http://familia-zbinden.blogspot.com

Surnames of South American origin